Tampere United is a Finnish football club from the city of Tampere. The club plays in Kakkonen, the third highest level of football in Finland.

The club had a team in Veikkausliiga, the premier football league in Finland, until the end of the 2010 season. It was excluded from participating in Finnish football during the 2011 season amidst suspicions of money laundering. The club was kept alive by its supporters, who entered a team called TamU-K in Kutonen, the lowest level of football in Finland, in 2012. The club earned three promotions in four years, and all its teams were taken over by Tampere United in the lead up to the 2016 season. Tampere United is now a fan-owned club and controlled by the same supporters who ran TamU-K.

History
The club was formed in July 1998. The initial plan was to merge two local football clubs FC Ilves and TPV but TPV decided to continue as its own team. FC Ilves continued to play in lower divisions and Tampere United inherited its place in the second highest division.

In their first season, 1999 they won promotion to the top division, 15 months after the formation of the club. During season 2000 they reached sixth place in the league. In their third season 2001 they won the Finnish championship.

In 2002, they finished in fifth place, and in 2003, third place. In 2006, Tampere United won their 2nd Finnish Championship and one year later, in 2007, they were the champions yet again taking home their 3rd title.

During the 2007 season, Tampere United also reached the third qualifying round of the UEFA Champions League. Tampere defeated Bulgarian champions Levski Sofia 2–0 on aggregate in the second qualifying round. Tampere United failed to reach the Champions League group stage when Rosenborg BK defeated them 5–0 on aggregate. In the UEFA Cup first round, United lost to Girondins de Bordeaux 4–3 on aggregate.

Exclusion and collapse

On 14 April 2011 the club were suspended indefinitely by the Football Association of Finland because they had received money from a dubious company based in Singapore, known for involvement in fixed games and money laundering. The club was excluded from the 2011 season of Veikkausliiga. Players under contract were released due to lack of funds.

The club did not participate in any league in 2012 or 2013. In April 2013 the Turku Court of Appeal found the former CEO Deniz Bavautdin and the former chairman of the board Harri Pyhältö guilty of money laundering.

Revival by the supporters

Supporters of Tampere United founded a supporters' trust in 2009 after the club had hit financial difficulties. The aim was to help fans gain a voice within the club and to buy shares of the club.

In 2012 the supporters' trust founded a new team named after the supporters' trust, TamU-K, In 2012 the team played in Kutonen, the bottom division in Finnish football, and gained promotion to Vitonen. The promotion playoff match that decided promotion had the attendance of 441. In 2013 the team was promoted to Vitonen and in 2014 the team made it to penalties in the promotion playoff and lost. After another season in Nelonen TamU-K was promoted to Kolmonen,

In the lead up to the 2016 season, Tampere United took over all the teams that played under TamU-K. Thereby the first team played in Kolmonen in 2016, and after the season it got promoted Kakkonen. In 2017 Tampere United finished sixth in Kakkonen Group B and in 2018 it finished ninth in Group C, and remains in Kakkonen in the 2019 season.

Honours
Veikkausliiga
 Champions: 2001, 2006, 2007

Finnish Cup
 Champions: 2007
 Runners-up: 2001, 2009

Finnish League Cup
 Champions: 2009
 Runners-up: 2011

Finnish Regions’ Cup
 Champions: 2021

Tampere United in Europe

Season to season

Current squad

Managers

 Harri Kampman (1999–2000)
 Ari Hjelm (2001–2010)
 Jarkko Wiss (2011)
 Antti Pettinen (2011–2012)
 Mika Suonsyrjä (2012–2015)
 Mikko Mäkelä (2016–2018)
 Leroy Maluka (2018)
 Mourad Seddiki (2019)
 Jukka Listenmaa (2020–)

References

External links
 Official website

 
Football clubs in Finland
Association football clubs established in 1998
1998 establishments in Finland
Sport in Tampere